Association Sportive de Monaco Basketball Club, commonly referred to as A.S. Monaco Basket, is a French-registered Monaco-based professional basketball club. They are a part of the Monaco-based multi-sports club of A.S. Monaco, which was founded in 1924.

The club's basketball section was founded in 1928, and it currently competes in the French top-tier level LNB Pro A and the EuroLeague. The team plays their home games at Salle Gaston Médecin.

History
About four years after the parent athletic club, A.S. Monaco, was itself founded, A.S. Monaco Basket was founded in 1928. They finished as runners-up in the French top-tier level Nationale 1 (current LNB Pro A) following the 1950 season, which is regarded as one of their greatest successes in their history. Monaco also won the LNB Pro B (French 2nd Division) championship in the 1973 season, with one of the greatest offenses on the European continent.

A.S. Monaco Basket joined the Nationale 1 for the 1973–74 season, where they finished in ninth place. They made their first appearance in the European 3rd-tier level FIBA Korać Cup in the 1974–75 season, where they lost in the group stage to other notable teams, such as the French League club ASVEL Basket, the Bulgarian League club Levski Sofia, and the Italian League club AMG Sebastiani Basket. They entered the same tournament again in the 1982–83 season, but lost to Dynamo Moscow in the semifinals qualification battle, in the Top 16 group stage, despite a far better finish in the tournament overall.

Entering the 1980s, Monaco was in the process of securing their title as one of the most dangerous teams in French basketball. They reached the finals game of the French Federation Cup, where they lost to Limoges CSP, by a score of 96–81. The Red and Whites also became a threat in the LNB Pro A (French 1st Division), what the league had been renamed to, after former NBA player, Robert Smith, joined the team in 1985. Smith was named the 1987 French League All-Star Game MVP.

After Smith left the team, Monaco found themselves descending in the league. They were relegated to the second division LNB Pro B, later in the decade, and eventually ended up in the Nationale 1 Division. They would not return to the LNB Pro A, the highest division of basketball in France, for many years to come. In 2014, A.S. Monaco Basket was crowned the champions of the French third-tier league, the Nationale Masculine 1 (NM1), and they returned to the LNB Pro B (French 2nd Division).

In the 2014–15 season, Monaco became the French 2nd-tier LNB Pro B champions, and they were finally promoted back to the top-tier league in France, the LNB Pro A. In 2015, the Ukrainian businessman and philanthropist, Sergey Dyadechko, became the President of A.S. Monaco Basket. In the 2015–16 season, Monaco won the 2016 edition of the French Pro A League Cup, after beating Élan Chalon in the finals, by a score of 99–74. Monaco player, Jamal Shuler, was named the French Pro A Leaders Cup MVP.

In the 2016–17 season, Monaco returned to European-wide competitions, when it qualified for one of the pan-European secondary level competitions, the FIBA Basketball Champions League. They finished the season in third place. In 2017, the charity fund, DSF, founded by the club's owner, Dyadechko, became a sponsor of A.S. Monaco Basket. The club also played in the FIBA Champions League, during the 2017–18 season, in which they finished in second place, after they lost to the Greek League club AEK Athens in the final, by a score of 100–94. The club won the 2017 French Pro A League Cup and the 2018 French Pro A League Cup titles. They also finished in second place in the French Pro A League, in the 2017–18 season.

In European-wide competitions, Monaco spent the next three seasons (2018–19, 2019–20, and 2020–21) playing in the other pan-European secondary level competition, the EuroCup, subsequently winning it in 2020–21. In the 2021–22 season, Monaco made its debut in the EuroLeague, the highest pan-European level. Finishing seventh in the regular season with a 15–13 record, Monaco qualified for the playoffs where they lost 2–3 to the second-seeded Olympiacos.

Arena
A.S. Monaco Basket plays its home games at the 3,000 seat Salle Gaston Médecin, which is a part of the Stade Louis II sports complex.

Due to minimum requirements, Monaco was supposed to play its 2021–22 EuroLeague games in the Azur Arena in Antibes. The decision was later overturned, thus the team could play in its usual home arena.

Logos

Players

Current roster

Depth chart

Trophies and honors

Domestic competitions
French Pro A
Runners-up (4): 1950, 2017–18, 2018–19 and 2022
French Federation Cup
Runners-up (1): 1982–83
French Pro A Leaders Cup
Winners (3): 2016, 2017, 2018
French Pro B
Champions (2): 1972–73, 2014–15
French NM1
Champions (1): 2013–14

European competitions
EuroCup
Champions (1): 2020–21
Basketball Champions League
Runners-up (1): 2017–18
Third place (1): 2016–17

Other competitions
Berlin, Germany Invitational Game
Winners (1): 2019

Season by season

Notable players 

France:
 Georgy Adams
 Cyril Akpomedah
 Éric Beugnot
 Moustapha Fall
 Paul Lacombe
 Yakuba Ouattara
 Jean Perniceni
 Amara Sy
 Philip Szanyiel
 Kim Tillie
 Ali Traoré
 Léo Westermann

Europe:
 Ivan Buva
 Aaron Cel
 Kyrylo Fesenko
 Sergii Gladyr
 Elmedin Kikanović
 Damjan Rudež
 Danilo Anđušić

USA:
 Dwayne Bacon
 /  Dee Bost
 Eric Buckner
 /  Nik Caner-Medley
 /  Anthony Clemmons
 Norris Cole
 D.J. Cooper
 Aaron Craft
 /  Brandon Davies
 Chris Evans
 Rob Gray
 /  Jarrod Jones
 Dru Joyce
 Paris Lee
 Darrel Mitchell
 /  Derek Needham
 /  DeMarcus Nelson
 J.J. O'Brien
 Gerald Robinson
 Jamal Shuler
 Robert Smith
 Mike Stewart
 /  Will Thomas
 /  Zack Wright

Rest of Americas & Oceania:
 Dylan Ennis
 Adrian Uter
 Brock Motum

Africa:
 Ibrahima Fall Faye
 Mehdi Hafsi
 Derrick Obasohan

Head coaches

References

External links 
Official website
A.S. Monaco Basket at Eurobasket.com

AS Monaco Basket
Basketball in Monaco
Basketball teams established in 1928
Basketball teams in France